The Marble Arch is a 19th-century white marble-faced triumphal arch in London, England. The structure was designed by John Nash in 1827 to be the state entrance to the cour d'honneur of Buckingham Palace; it stood near the site of what is today the three-bayed, central projection of the palace containing the well-known balcony. In 1851, on the initiative of architect and urban planner Decimus Burton, a one-time pupil of John Nash, it was relocated to its current site. Following the widening of Park Lane in the early 1960s, the site became a large traffic island at the junction of Oxford Street, Park Lane and Edgware Road, isolating the arch. Admiralty Arch, Holyhead in Wales is a similar arch, also cut off from public access, at the other end of the A5.

Only members of the Royal Family and the King's Troop, Royal Horse Artillery are said to be permitted to pass through the arch; this happens in ceremonial processions.

The arch gives its name to the area surrounding it, particularly the southern portion of Edgware Road and also to the underground station. The arch is not part of the Royal Parks and is maintained by Westminster City Council.

Design and construction

Nash's three-arch design is based on that of the Arch of Constantine in Rome and the Arc de Triomphe du Carrousel in Paris. The triumphal arch is faced with Carrara marble with embellishments of marble extracted from quarries near Seravezza in Tuscany, Italy.
 
John Flaxman was chosen to make the commemorative sculpture. After his death in 1826, the commission was divided between Sir Richard Westmacott, Edward Hodges Baily and J. C. F. Rossi. In 1829, a bronze equestrian statue of George IV was commissioned from Sir Francis Chantrey, with the intention of placing it on top of the arch.

Construction began in 1827, but was cut short in 1830, following the death of the spendthrift King George IV – the rising costs were unacceptable to the new king, William IV, who later tried to offload the uncompleted palace onto Parliament as a substitute for the recently destroyed Palace of Westminster.

Work restarted in 1832, this time under the supervision of Edward Blore, who greatly reduced Nash's planned attic stage and omitted its sculpture, including the statue of George IV. The arch was completed in 1833.

Some of the unused sculpture, including parts of Westmacott's frieze of Waterloo and the Nelson panels, were used at Buckingham Palace. His victory statues and Rossi's relief of Europe and Asia were used at the National Gallery. In 1843 the equestrian statue of George IV was installed on one of the pedestals in Trafalgar Square.

The white marble soon lost its light colouring in the polluted London atmosphere. In 1847, Sharpe's London Magazine described it as "discoloured by smoke and damp, and in appearance resembling a huge sugar erection in a confectioner's shop window."

Relocation

Buckingham Palace remained unoccupied, and for the most part unfinished, until it was hurriedly completed upon the accession of Queen Victoria in 1837. Within a few years, the palace was found to be too small for the large court and the Queen's expanding family. The solution was to enlarge the palace by enclosing the cour d'honneur with a new east range. This façade is today the principal front and public face of the palace and shields the inner façades containing friezes and marbles matching and complementing those of the arch.

When building work began in 1847, the arch was dismantled and rebuilt by Thomas Cubitt as a ceremonial entrance to the northeast corner of Hyde Park at Cumberland Gate.  The reconstruction was completed in March 1851. A popular story says that the arch was moved because it was too narrow for the Queen's state coach to pass through, but, in fact, the Gold State Coach passed under it during Elizabeth II's coronation in 1953.

Three small rooms inside the rebuilt arch were used as a police station from 1851 until at least 1968 (John Betjeman made a programme inside it in 1968 and referred to it as a fully functional police station). It firstly housed the royal constables of the Park and later the Metropolitan Police. One policeman stationed there during the early 1860s was Samuel Parkes, who won the Victoria Cross in the Charge of the Light Brigade in 1854, during the Crimean War.

In 2005 it was speculated that the arch might be moved across the street to Hyde Park, or to a more accessible location than its current position on a large traffic island.

Park Lane widening
 
Park Lane was widened as part of the Park Lane Improvement Scheme of the London County Council, and the Marble Arch became stranded on a traffic island. The scheme required an act of Parliament in 1958, and during the passage of the Park Lane Improvement Bill the possibility of providing an underpass instead of a roundabout was dismissed due to excessive cost and the need to demolish buildings on Edgware Road. As part of the scheme, gardens were laid out around the arch on the traffic island. The works took place between 1960 and 1964.

Still Water, a large bronze sculpture of a horse's head by Nic Fiddian-Green, was unveiled on the same traffic island a short distance from the arch in 2011.

Marble Arch area 

Having a tube station means that the arch gives rise to a colloquial, entirely modern London "area", with no parishes or established institutions bearing its name.  This generally equates to parts in view of the arch of Mayfair, Marylebone and often all of St George's Fields, Marylebone (west of Edgware Road) all in the City of Westminster, London, W1H.

The eponymous London Underground station is Marble Arch on the Central line.

The area around the arch forms a major road junction connecting Oxford Street to the east, Park Lane (A4202) to the south, Bayswater Road (A402) to the west, and Edgware Road (A5) to the north-west.  The short road directly to the north of the arch is also known as Marble Arch.

The former cinema Odeon Marble Arch was located directly adjacent to the junction. Before 1997 this had the largest cinema screen in London. The Odeon showcased 70 mm films in a large circle-and-stalls auditorium. It closed in 2016 and was demolished later that same year.

The arch also stands close to the former site of the Tyburn gallows (sometimes called "Tyburn Tree"), a place of public execution from 1388 until 1793.

In 2021 the Marble Arch Mound, a temporary viewing platform, was opened at the site.

Image gallery

Sculptures intended for the arch used elsewhere

References
Citations

Sources

External links

 AboutBritain.com information

Cultural infrastructure completed in 1833
Grade I listed buildings in the City of Westminster
Grade I listed monuments and memorials
John Nash buildings
Monuments and memorials in London
Regency London
Relocated buildings and structures
Road junctions in London
Terminating vistas in the United Kingdom
Triumphal arches in the United Kingdom
Tourist attractions in London
Tourist attractions in the City of Westminster
Regency architecture in London
1833 establishments in England